Glinno may refer to the following places in Poland:
Glinno, Lower Silesian Voivodeship (south-west Poland)
Glinno, Łódź Voivodeship (central Poland)
Glinno, Nowy Tomyśl County in Greater Poland Voivodeship (west-central Poland)
Glinno, Poznań County in Greater Poland Voivodeship (west-central Poland)
Glinno, Wągrowiec County in Greater Poland Voivodeship (west-central Poland)
Glinno, Pomeranian Voivodeship (north Poland)
Glinno, West Pomeranian Voivodeship (north-west Poland)